Xastilia is a genus of sea snails, marine gastropod mollusks in the family Muricidae, the murex snails or rock snails.

Species
Species within the genus Xastilia include:

 Xastilia kosugei Bouchet & Houart, 1994

References

Muricopsinae
Monotypic gastropod genera